The 1978 Atlanta Braves season was the 108th season for the franchise and their 13th in Atlanta.

Offseason 
 December 8, 1977: Willie Montañez was traded by the Braves to the New York Mets as part of a four-team trade. Adrian Devine, Tommy Boggs, and Eddie Miller were traded by the Texas Rangers to the Braves. The Rangers sent Bert Blyleven to the Pittsburgh Pirates, and the Mets sent John Milner to the Pirates. The Rangers sent Tom Grieve and a player to be named later to the Mets. The Pirates sent Al Oliver and Nelson Norman to the Rangers, and the Mets sent Jon Matlack to the Rangers. The Rangers completed the trade by sending Ken Henderson to the Mets on March 15, 1978.
 March 30, 1978: Buzz Capra was released by the Atlanta Braves.

Managerial turnover: Bobby Cox begins his first term
In May 1977, owner Ted Turner had stunned baseball when—in the midst of a 16-game losing streak—he furloughed manager Dave Bristol, sent him on a ten-day scouting trip, and took the reins of the team himself; on May 11, he donned uniform #27 and skippered the Braves to their 17th straight loss. National League president Chub Feeney and Commissioner of Baseball Bowie Kuhn then stepped in and forbade the owner from managing his own ballclub, citing MLB rules that apparently took effect after Connie Mack retired as owner-manager of the Philadelphia Athletics in 1950. Veteran coach Vern Benson ran the Braves the following night (and broke the losing skein), and then Bristol was rehired for the balance of the season.

However, that chaotic season was followed by one of the most important events in Braves' history: the hiring of Bobby Cox, briefly a Braves' farm system player, as manager for 1978.  Cox was then a 36-year-old, relatively unknown former third baseman who had spent the previous ten seasons in the New York Yankees' organization, including six years (1971–1976) as a highly successful minor league manager and one season as the first-base coach on the Yankees' 1977 world championship team. Cox would spend four seasons, 1978–1981, during this first term in the Braves' dugout.  While his first two years produced frustrating, last-place seasons in the National League West, by Cox' third year, the Braves posted a winning (81–80) mark and rose to fourth place in their division. Attendance began to climb, with the team exceeding the one-million mark at Atlanta–Fulton County Stadium for the first time since 1971. But the strike-shortened  season was a major disappointment; the Braves fell to 50–56, and Cox was fired. He went 266–323 (.452) during his inaugural tenure.

His successor, former New York Mets skipper Joe Torre, would lead the Braves to the  National League West Division championship. Cox would land with the Toronto Blue Jays as their 1982 manager. The Jays were then a five-year-old expansion team that had never escaped the basement of the American League East Division, nor won more than 67 games in a season. Meanwhile, the Braves' front office was in flux and owner Turner was seeking a strong hand to take over the team's baseball operations as general manager. He lured Cox back to Atlanta with a multi-year contract. And, although the team struggled desperately on the field in the late 1980s, general manager Cox was assembling a base of talent that, when he returned to the dugout to manage the Braves for his second term, on June 23, 1990, would ignite a series of first-place divisional teams (for 15 out of 16 straight seasons) and five National League pennant winners (as well as the 1995 World Series title) that would earn Cox a place in the Baseball Hall of Fame by his 2010 retirement.

Regular season 
May 1, 1978: In a game versus the New York Mets, Braves manager Bobby Cox was ejected from a game for the first time in his career. Cox would go on to set the record for most ejections by a manager.
June 16, 1978:  Bob Horner, freshly signed by the Braves off the Arizona State University campus, hits a home run off the Pittsburgh Pirates' Bert Blyleven in his first professional game.  Horner would go on to hit 23 home runs, leading all National League third basemen, and win the National League Rookie of the Year award.

Season standings

Record vs. opponents

Notable transactions 
 May 16, 1978: Jim Bouton was signed as a free agent by the Braves.
 September 22, 1978: Cito Gaston was purchased from the Braves by the Pittsburgh Pirates.

Roster

Player stats

Batting

Starters by position 
Note: Pos = Position; G = Games played; AB = At bats; H = Hits; Avg. = Batting average; HR = Home runs; RBI = Runs batted in

Other batters 
Note: G = Games played; AB = At bats; H = Hits; Avg. = Batting average; HR = Home runs; RBI = Runs batted in

Pitching

Starting pitchers 
Note: G = Games pitched; IP = Innings pitched; W = Wins; L = Losses; ERA = Earned run average; SO = Strikeouts

Other pitchers 
Note: G = Games pitched; IP = Innings pitched; W = Wins; L = Losses; ERA = Earned run average; SO = Strikeouts

Relief pitchers 
Note: G = Games pitched; W = Wins; L = Losses; SV = Saves; ERA = Earned run average; SO = Strikeouts

Farm system 

LEAGUE CHAMPIONS: Richmond, Greenwood

Awards and honors

League leaders 
Phil Niekro, National League leader, Losses

Notes

References 

1978 Atlanta Braves season at Baseball Reference
Atlanta Braves on Baseball Almanac

Atlanta Braves seasons
Atlanta Braves season
Atlanta